Neuroxena ansorgei is a moth of the  subfamily Arctiinae. It is found in Democratic Republic of Congo, Kenya, Tanzania and Uganda.

References

 Natural History Museum Lepidoptera generic names catalog

Nyctemerina